Elachista erebophthalma is a moth of the family Elachistidae. It is found in southernmost Victoria, Australia.

The wingspan is about 8.8 mm for males. The forewings are pale grey with dark grey tipped scales. The hindwings and fringe scales are grey.

References

Moths described in 1897
erebophthalma
Moths of Australia